Livermore is an unincorporated community and a U.S. Post Office in Larimer County, Colorado, United States.  The Livermore Post Office has the ZIP Code 80536.

A post office called Livermore has been in operation since 1871. According to tradition, the community's name is an amalgamation of the names of settlers Livernash and Moore.

Geography
Livermore is located at  (40.7944262, -105.2172034).

References

Unincorporated communities in Larimer County, Colorado
Unincorporated communities in Colorado